Allison M. Macfarlane directs the School of Public Policy and Global Affairs at the University of British Columbia. She is the former director of the Institute for International Science and Technology Policy at George Washington University, where she was Professor of Science Policy and International Affairs. She was the chairman of the United States Nuclear Regulatory Commission (NRC) from July 9, 2012, to December 31, 2014.

Education and career
Macfarlane was educated at the University of Rochester, where she earned B.Sc. in Geological Sciences in 1987, and at Massachusetts Institute of Technology, where she earned a Ph.D. in Geology in 1992. She held fellowships at Radcliffe College, Harvard University, Stanford University, and MIT.  She was also assistant professor of earth science and international affairs at Georgia Tech from 2003-4. Prior to taking the top position at the NRC, Dr. Macfarlane was an associate professor of environmental science and policy at George Mason University.

While at GMU, Macfarlane was a member of the Blue Ribbon Commission on America's Nuclear Future from 2010 to 2012. The panel was charged by the Secretary of Energy to examine the issues associated with nuclear waste disposal in the United States.

When NRC commission chair Gregory Jaczko was forced to step down before the end of his term in May 2012, Macfarlane was appointed to complete the term. She was then reconfirmed for a full five-year term by the United States Senate on July 1, 2013.

As Chairman of the NRC, Macfarlane prioritized the geological and operational lessons learned from the North Anna and Fukushima incidents, as well as improving the NRC's communication with public stakeholders and paying more attention to the back end of the fuel cycle in an era when more U.S. nuclear power plants were being decommissioned than built.  She also pushed to make the NRC a more family-friendly workplace.  Given that she had raised questions a decade earlier about the suitability of the Yucca Mountain site for long-term geologic disposal of high-level nuclear waste, supporters of Yucca Mountain expected her to stall NRC licensing of Yucca Mountain, but she complied with a court order that ruled her predecessor's actions illegal and directed the NRC to continue its licensing review until it had spent down the funds made available for this purpose by Congress.

After leaving the NRC, Macfarlane became the Director of the Institute for International Science and Technology Policy and a Professor of science policy and international affairs at Elliott School of International Affairs at the George Washington University in December 2014.  She has written at least ten articles for the Bulletin of the Atomic Scientists.

Views
In her 2006 book, Uncertainty Underground, Macfarlane criticized plans to store spent nuclear fuel in a mountain near Las Vegas called Yucca Mountain. She said the seismic and volcanic activity as well as oxidizing in the environment would make the nuclear waste unstable. Macfarlane has supported storing nuclear waste at reactor sites in dry casks and the allocation of billions to find a suitable geologic repository for storage over the next few decades.

Works 
"Déjà vu for U.S. nuclear waste". Science. 30 June 2017

Uncertainty Underground: Yucca Mountain and the Nation's High Level Nuclear Waste, MIT Press, 2006.

Personal life
Macfarlane is married to Hugh Gusterson, a professor of anthropology and author of works on nuclear culture, with whom she has two children.

References

External links

 Nuclear agency’s new chief, Allison Macfarlane, on science and ‘Downton Abbey’
  NRC Chief says agency prioritized lessons from Japan disaster
  For new nuclear chief, concerns over plant safety
   What's next for the NRC: A conversation with Allison Macfarlane
   Welcome Remarks International Regulators Conference on Nuclear Security, December 4, 2012.
  Speech to Institute for Nuclear Power Operations (INPO), Atlanta, November 6, 2012.
  Platts Energy Week TV interview November 25, 2012
  Press Conference at National Press Club August 14, 2012
  Keynote address Carnegie International Nuclear Policy Conference April 8, 2013
  Remarks at Fuel Cycle Exchange conference, Rockville, MD, June 11, 2013
  Remarks at State Liaison Officers Conference, Rockville MD, November 5, 2013
  Remarks at American Nuclear Society meeting, November 11, 2013
  Regulatory Information Conference keynote address, March 11, 2014 video
  Regulatory Information Conference keynote address official text, March 11, 2014
  Regulatory Information Conference keynote address slides, March 11. 2014
On leadership and nuclear power The Washington Post interview August 6, 2013.
  The New York Times profile November 17, 2014.
  The Washington Post profile October 21, 2014.
 Galison, Peter & Robb Moss, "Containment" (documentary), Independent Lens, premiered January 9, 2017 on U.S. PBS. Interviewed as part of review of nuclear power and waste disposal.

Living people
George Washington University faculty
George Mason University faculty
Nuclear Regulatory Commission officials
People associated with nuclear power
University of Rochester alumni
Year of birth missing (living people)
Obama administration personnel